The Nova Scotia Voyageurs were a professional ice hockey team, based in Halifax, Nova Scotia, Canada. They played in the American Hockey League, from 1971 to 1984. Originally chartered as the Houston Apollos of the Central Hockey League, the organization was relocated to Montreal after five seasons due to low attendance and travel costs.  The Voyageurs (or "Vees" for short) played their first two seasons (1969–71), as the Montreal Voyageurs and were the affiliate of the National Hockey League's Montreal Canadiens.

In 1971, they relocated to Halifax, Nova Scotia. They were the first AHL team to be located in Atlantic Canada, and would be the first to play in the Halifax Metro Centre. The team was also the first Canadian club to win the Calder Cup, and were the class of the league for many years - only in two seasons did the team garner a losing record, and the Voyageurs never missed the playoffs.  The team eventually moved to Sherbrooke, Quebec to become the Sherbrooke Canadiens.

The Vees won three Calder Cups, the first in 1972. Nova Scotia won again in 1976 and 1977, while their parent Canadiens were winning back-to-back Stanley Cups; this is the only time an NHL/AHL affiliated combo have won both Cups in the same year twice.

The team was replaced in Halifax by the Nova Scotia Oilers, an affiliate of the Edmonton Oilers and subsequently the Halifax Citadels, an affiliate of the Quebec Nordiques.

With the success of the Voyageurs in its existence of 13 seasons, it spawned a period of 34 consecutive years where there would be at least one AHL team in Atlantic Canada. This was largely due to the desire of several Canadian NHL franchises to continue to pay players sent down to the minors in Canadian dollars throughout the 1980s and 1990s. However, by the late 1990s, many of the remaining AHL teams in Atlantic Canada had disappeared, either by relocation or by the franchise being rendered dormant. The last remaining team in this long period would be the St. John's Maple Leafs, which moved from St. John's, Newfoundland and Labrador in 2005 to Toronto, Ontario to play as the Toronto Marlies. The AHL did not return to Atlantic Canada until 2011 with the St. John's IceCaps.

Team records
Single Season
Goals: 52  Yvon Lambert (1971–72)
Assists: 73  John Chabot (1982–83)
Points: 104  Yvon Lambert (1971–72), 104  Peter Sullivan (1974–75)
Penalty Minutes: 335  Dwight Schofield (1981–82)
GAA:
SV%:
Career
Career Goals: 103,  Dan Metivier
Career Assists: 163,  Wayne Thompson
Career Points: 251,  Don Howse
Career Penalty Minutes: 1084,  Dave Allison
Career Goaltending Wins:
Career Shutouts:
Career Games: 371, Jim Cahoon

Notable alumni
List of Voyageurs alumni that played more than 100 games in Halifax, and also played at least 100 games in the National Hockey League and/or World Hockey Association.

 Keith Acton
 Dave Allison
 Ron Andruff
 Jeff Brubaker
 Mike Busniuk
 Guy Carbonneau
 Dan Daoust
 Norm Dupont
 Brian Engblom
 Tony Featherstone
 Greg Fox
 Ed Gilbert
 Glenn Goldup
 Mark Holden
 Pat Hughes
 Yvon Lambert
 Peter Lee
 Craig Levie
 Dave Lumley
 Gilles Lupien
 Mike McPhee
 Rick Meagher
 Pierre Mondou
 Bob Murray
 Bill Nyrop
 Greg Paslawski
 Mike Polich
 Noel Price
 Bill Riley
 Larry Robinson
 Bill Root
 Randy Rota
 Rod Schutt
 Dwight Schofield
 Peter Sullivan
 Michel Therrien
 John Van Boxmeer
 Rick Wilson
 Ron Wilson
 Paul Woods

Coaches
Al MacNeil - 1971–72 to 1976–77
Frank St. Marseille - 1977–78 to 1978–79
Bert Templeton - 1979–80 to 1980–81
John Brophy - 1981–82 to 1983–84

Season-by-season results
 Montreal Voyageurs 1969–1971
 Nova Scotia Voyageurs 1971–1984

Regular season

Playoffs

See also
List of ice hockey teams in Nova Scotia
Sports teams in Halifax, Nova Scotia

 
Sport in Halifax, Nova Scotia
Ice hockey clubs established in 1969
Ice hockey clubs disestablished in 1971
Ice hockey clubs established in 1971
Sports clubs disestablished in 1984
1969 establishments in Nova Scotia
1971 establishments in Nova Scotia
Atlanta Flames minor league affiliates
Montreal Canadiens minor league affiliates